Sai Baba - Tere Hazaron Haath (English: Sai Baba - You Have Thousands Hands) is an Indian Hindi television series which premiered on 9 October 2005 on Star Plus. The show stars Mukul Nag as Sai Baba of Shirdi.

The show was again telecast on Star Plus from 22 June 2020 during the lockdown due to coronavirus.

Cast
 Mukul Nag as Sai Baba of Shirdi
 Arvind Singh Rausaria as Mhalsapat
 Anukamal as Baijaa Baai
 Jyotin Dave as Kote Patil
 Sagar Saini as Shyama
 Kumar Hegde as Kulkarni
 Priyanka Tiwari as Manjula
 Anukamal as Baija Maa

References

External links
 

Sai Baba of Shirdi
StarPlus original programming
2005 Indian television series debuts
Hindi-language television shows